Kingston was a short-lived rural district in Surrey, England from 1894 to 1895.

The district was formed by the Local Government Act 1894 as the successor to Kingston Rural Sanitary District.

The district comprised the following civil parishes:
Coombe
Esher
Hook
Long Ditton
Malden
Thames Ditton
West Molesey

The rural district was abolished in 1895 when all the parishes were included in urban districts:

Coombe and Malden were combined with New Malden Urban District to become The Maldens and Coombe Urban District
Esher, Thames Ditton and most of Long Ditton became Esher and the Dittons Urban District
Hook and the Tolworth area of Long Ditton were added to Surbiton Urban District
West Molesey was added to East Molesey Urban District to create East and West Molesey Urban District

References
Frederic A Youngs Jr., Guide to the Local Administrative Units of England, Vol. I: Southern England, London 1979

Districts of England created by the Local Government Act 1894
History of Surrey
Rural districts of England